Black Combe is a fell in the south-west corner of the Lake District National Park, England, just  from the Irish Sea. It lies near the west coast of Cumbria in the borough of Copeland and more specifically, in the ancient district of Millom.

Black Combe is a Marilyn and, at 600m, it is only 10m short of being a Hewitt. Sub-tops include White Combe, Stoupdale Head, Swinside Fell and Stoneside Hill.  The first two but not the last two are included in the index of  Wainwright's The Outlying Fells of Lakeland and thus in lists of "Outlying fells". (All four sub-tops are shown on Wainwright's map of the fell in that book

The view from Black Combe is unique, a result of its isolated position to the south and west of the main Lake District fells. William Wordsworth claimed that "the amplest range of unobstructed prospect may be seen that British ground commands." Half the view is the glittering sea, with the Isle of Man seen clearly to the west, and the hills of Wales and Scotland seen as shadowy silhouettes.

On the seaward side views extend from the Cumbrian coast, and from Criffel,  to the north, a mountain on the Scottish coast near Dumfries, round to the Isle of Man,  due west, then round to Snowdon which may be seen on days of exceptionally good visibility,  to the south, to the coast of Lancashire. On the landward side, views include the Scafell Group and the Coniston Group of fells in the Lake District National Park, including four  mountains: Skiddaw, Scafell, Scafell Pike and Helvellyn. To the east and south the Pennine Hills, the Forest of Bowland and Blackpool Tower are visible. Closer by, there are also good views over the Duddon Estuary, Millom and the wind farm just offshore.

Black Combe is easy to see across Morecambe Bay as the most westerly outlying fell of the Lake District National Park. The name of the Cumberland View public house in Morecambe reflects the fact that Black Combe used to stand in the historical county of Cumberland. It can also be seen from the top end of the Wirral peninsula, between the turbines of the new Burbo Bank Offshore Wind Farm.

Clearly visible in views of Black Combe from the south and east is the large, dark-coloured glacial corrie, known as Blackcombe, from which the fell's name is derived. Such corries are often known as combes in English place names, a word cognate with the Welsh word cwm. Adjacent to Blackcombe is a lighter-coloured corrie called Whitecombe.

Black Combe was one of the five stations in Cumberland used by the Ordnance Survey to measure the angles of Principal Triangles for their initial survey of Britain in the years up to and including 1809. The other stations were "Dent Hill", Scilly Banks (on the outskirts of Whitehaven), High Pike and Cross Fell.

The Black Combe Walking Festival takes place annually in June and the Black Combe fell race takes place in early March.

The Swinside, or Sunken Kirk, stone circle is on the eastern flanks of Swinside Fell, in the north east of Black Combe.

Geology
The rocks of Black Combe were formed during the Ordovician period, roughly 460 million years ago.  Faulting has exposed an inlier of mudstones from the Skiddaw Group. These rocks, largely mudstones, siltstones and occasional sandstones or greywackes, were formed in deep seas when occasional slides of coastal sediments were redeposited at greater depth.

The nearby Millom Park includes Millom Rock Park, open to the public at all times.

Routes

A more challenging and interesting route begins at Beckside Farm on the A595 road and follows Whitecombe Beck before ascending the Horse Back ridge. This ridge separates Blackcombe and Whitecombe on the eastern side of the fell, and gives good views into both combes.

The summit plateau is a very flat peat-covered area. There is a Triangulation Pillar on the top, surrounded by rough drystone wall which forms a wind shelter.  due south from the peak is a lesser peak upon which stands a large cairn which is easily visible with the naked eye from Millom and the surrounding area. Between this cairn and the top, in a shallow valley, lies a small tarn.

Black Combe is the subject of a chapter of Wainwright's book The Outlying Fells of Lakeland. While most of the chapters of that book describe single, usually circular, walks, Black Combe is treated similarly to the summits in the main Pictorial Guide to the Lakeland Fells: the author describes three distinct ascent routes (from the south at Whicham, the west on the A595 road, the north on the fell road) and a circuit of White Combe to the east. 

Black Combe is included as Walk 27 in the Ordnance Survey's Lake District volume of their Pathfinder Guides Outstanding Circular Walks series. This describes an 8.5m (13.5km) walk starting near Whicham Church, ascending from the south and then descending to the north-west before returning via Whitbeck.

References

Marilyns of England
Fells of the Lake District
Whicham